Gaby may refer to:

People
Gaby is short for Gabrielle, Gabriella or Gabriel, and in particular may refer to:
Gaby (singer) (born 1965), Panamanian Reggae en Español and Reggaeton singer and rapper
Gaby, a Spanish clown, one of Los Payasos de la Tele
Gaby Aghion (1921–2014), French fashion designer and founder of the fashion house Chloé
Gabriel Aragón (1920–1995), Spanish clown better known as Gaby
Gaby Canizales (born 1960), American former welterweight boxing world champion
Gaby Charroux (born 1942), French politician
Gaby Deslys (1881–1920), French dancer, singer and actress
Gaby Espino (born 1977), Venezuelan actress and model
Gaby Hoffmann (born 1982), American actress
Gaby Layoun (born 1964), Lebanese politician
Gaby Lewis (born 2001), Irish cricketer
Gaby Mudingayi (born 1981), Belgian footballer
Gaby Roslin (born 1964), British presenter
Gaby Sánchez (born 1983), American Major League Baseball player
Gabriela Pérez del Solar, Peruvian volleyball player, publicist and politician
Gabrielle (Gaby) van Zuylen (1933–2010), French garden designer and garden writer
Gaby Wood (born 1971), English journalist and literary critic

Places 
 Gaby, Aosta Valley. an Italian comune (municipality) in Aosta Valley
1665 Gaby, an asteroid
Île Gaby, an island in the Kerguelen islands, France

Others
Gaby (film), a 1956 film by Curtis Bernhardt

See also

Gabby (disambiguation)